Terri Juanita Vaughn (born October 16, 1969) is an American actress, director and producer. She is best known for her role as high school secretary Lovita Alizay Jenkins-Robinson in The WB sitcom The Steve Harvey Show (1997–2002), for which she received three NAACP Image Award for Outstanding Supporting Actress in a Comedy Series. She later co-starred in the UPN/The CW sitcom All of Us (2003–2005), and TBS sitcom Meet the Browns (2009–2011).

Career
In her early career, Vaughn appeared in the films Friday and Don't Be a Menace to South Central While Drinking Your Juice in the Hood. She co-starred opposite Joan Severance in the comedy-action film Black Scorpion (1995) and its sequel, Black Scorpion II: Aftershock (1997). Later in 1997, Vaughn was cast as high school secretary Lovita Alizay Jenkins-Robinson for the second season of The WB sitcom The Steve Harvey Show. She received three NAACP Image Award for Outstanding Supporting Actress in a Comedy Series for her performance on show. The series ended in 2002, and Vaughn later that year joined the cast of Showtime drama series Soul Food as Eva Holly. She received another NAACP Image Award for Outstanding Supporting Actress in a Drama Series nomination.

From 2003 to 2005, Vaughn was regular cast member on the UPN/The CW sitcom All of Us. In 2007, she had supporting role in the Tyler Perry's comedy-drama film Daddy's Little Girls opposite Gabrielle Union, and later had a regular role on another of Perry's productions, Meet the Browns (2009-2011). She owns a production company called Nina Holiday Entertainment, that produced films such as Sugar Mommas, A Cross to Bear and Girlfriends' Getaway. In 2016, Vaughn made her directing debut with the comedy film #DigitalLivesMatter.

In 2016, Vaughn was cast in the recurring role as housekeeper in Oprah Winfrey Network drama series, Greenleaf opposite Keith David and Lynn Whitfield. In 2020 Vaughn had a recurring role as Robin in Shona Ferguson's South African TV series, Kings Of Jo'Burg shown on Netflix

Personal life
Vaughn grew up in San Francisco, California. She was married to Derrick Carolina and had a son, Daylen Ali (2001). She is currently married to former football player Karon Riley, and the couple have both a son and a daughter.

Filmography

Film

Television

Awards and nominations

References

External links

1969 births
Living people
Actresses from San Francisco
American television actresses
African-American actresses
American film actresses
20th-century American actresses
21st-century American actresses
20th-century African-American women
20th-century African-American people
21st-century African-American women
21st-century African-American people
African-American film directors